L 1157 is a dark nebula in the constellation Cepheus. It was catalogued in 1962 by U.S. astronomer Beverly T. Lynds in her Catalogue of Dark Nebulae, becoming the 1157th entry in the table; hence the designation. The cloud contains an estimated 3,900 Solar masses of material. It includes protostars that are ejecting material in bipolar outflows, forming bow shocks in the surrounding ambient gas. Formamide and HCNO have been detected in these shocked regions, among other compounds.

References

External links
 http://jumk.de/astronomie/special-stars/l1157.shtml
 http://simbad.u-strasbg.fr/simbad/sim-id?protocol=html&Ident=L1157&NbIdent=1&Radius=2&Radius.unit=arcmin&submit=submit+id

Dark nebulae
Cepheus (constellation)